George Davey Smith  (born 9 May 1959) is a British epidemiologist. He has been professor of clinical epidemiology at the University of Bristol since 1994, honorary professor of public health at the University of Glasgow since 1996, and visiting professor at the London School of Hygiene and Tropical Medicine since 1999.

He was also the scientific director of the Avon Longitudinal Study of Parents and Children (until replaced in 2017 by Nic Timpson) and a former editor-in-chief of the International Journal of Epidemiology.

Education
Davey Smith attended Stockton Heath Primary School and Lymm Grammar School in Warrington in North West England. He received a BA from Queen's College, Oxford in 1981, an MB BChir from Jesus College, Cambridge in 1984, an MSc from the London School of Hygiene and Tropical Medicine in 1988, an MD from Jesus College, Cambridge in 1991, and a DSc from Queen's College, Oxford in 2000.

Honours and awards
Davey Smith is an ISI highly cited researcher, a fellow of the Royal Society of Edinburgh, and a fellow of the Academy of Medical Sciences, United Kingdom. In 2019 Smith became foreign member of the Royal Netherlands Academy of Arts and Sciences.

References

External links

 

British public health doctors
Living people
1959 births
People from Warrington
Academics of the University of Bristol
Academic journal editors
Fellows of the Royal Society of Edinburgh
Fellows of the Academy of Medical Sciences (United Kingdom)
Academics of the University of Glasgow
Academics of the London School of Hygiene & Tropical Medicine
British epidemiologists
Members of the Royal Netherlands Academy of Arts and Sciences
Members of the National Academy of Medicine